Withania adunensis is a species of plant in the family Solanaceae. It is endemic to Yemen.  Its natural habitats are subtropical or tropical dry forests and subtropical or tropical dry shrubland.

References

adunensis
Endemic flora of Socotra
Least concern plants
Taxonomy articles created by Polbot